Eva Rueber-Staier (born 20 February 1951) is an Austrian actress, TV host, model and beauty queen who won Miss World 1969.

Biography
Rueber-Staier was born in 1951 in Bruck an der Mur, Styria. She won the title of Miss Austria and participated in the Miss Universe 1969 contest, in which she was a top 15 semi-finalist. She also went on to win the Miss World 1969 pageant. During her tenure, she starred in the Bob Hope USO tour in South Vietnam.

Her acting career contains a recurring James Bond credit: she played General Gogol's assistant Rublevitch in the films The Spy Who Loved Me, For Your Eyes Only, and Octopussy.

Eva Rueber Staier married British film director Ronald Fouracre at the Caxton Hall register office on 2 January 1973. They were married until her husband's death on 2 July 1983.

She has lived in an Elizabethan Grade II listed house in Pinner since 1984 and moved there when she was expecting her first and only child, Ronald's son Alexander Fouracre, who lives in Willesden Green and works as a camera man.  She currently lives with her second husband, publisher Brian Cowan.

She also played the Cadbury Flake girl in the 1980s Austrian Skiing advert directed by Ridley Scott.

She now produces metalwork sculptures; some were exhibited during Hertfordshire Visual Arts Forum's "open studios 2008".

Filmography

References

External links

1951 births
Austrian beauty pageant winners
Austrian film actresses
Living people
Miss Universe 1969 contestants
Miss World winners
Miss World 1969 delegates
People from Bruck an der Mur
United Service Organizations entertainers